Desperate Man may refer to:

 Desperate Man (album), by Eric Church
 "Desperate Man" (song), the title track
 The Desperate Man, a 1959 British film
 The Desperate Man (novel), a French novel by Léon Bloy
 "A Desperate Man", an episode of American crime drama series NCIS

See also
 Le Désespéré, also known as The Desperate Man in English, a self-portrait by Gustave Courbet